In algebraic geometry, a conic bundle is an algebraic variety that appears as a solution of a Cartesian equation of the form

 

Theoretically, it can be considered as a Severi–Brauer surface, or more precisely as a Châtelet surface. This can be a double covering of a ruled surface. Through an isomorphism, it can be associated with a symbol  in the second Galois cohomology of the field .

In fact, it is a surface with a well-understood divisor class group and simplest cases share with Del Pezzo surfaces the property of being a rational surface. But many problems of contemporary mathematics remain open, notably (for those examples which are not rational) the question of unirationality.

A naive point of view 

To write correctly a conic bundle, one must first reduce the quadratic form of the left hand side. Thus, after a harmless change, it has a simple expression like

 

In a second step, it should be placed in a projective space in order to complete the surface "at infinity".

To do this, we write the equation in homogeneous coordinates and expresses the first visible part of the fiber

 

That is not enough to complete the fiber as non-singular (smooth and proper), and then glue it to infinity by a change of classical maps:

Details are below about the map-change .

The fiber c 

Going a little further, while simplifying the issue, limit to cases where the field  is of characteristic zero and denote by  any integer except zero. Denote by P(T) a polynomial with coefficients in the field , of degree 2m or 2m − 1, without multiple root. Consider the scalar a.

Definition

and

along the open sets by isomorphisms

One shows the following result :

Fundamental property

The surface Fa,P is a k smooth and proper surface, the mapping defined by

by

and the same on  gives to Fa,P a structure of conic bundle over P1,k.

See also 
 Algebraic surface
 Intersection number (algebraic geometry)
 List of complex and algebraic surfaces

References
 

Algebraic geometry
Algebraic varieties